The 2015–16 Old Dominion Monarchs women’s basketball team represents Old Dominion University during the 2015–16 NCAA Division I women's basketball season. The Monarchs, led by fifth year head coach Karen Barefoot, played their home games at Ted Constant Convocation Center and were members of Conference USA. They finished the season 17–17, 10–8 in C-USA play to finish in fifth place. They advanced to the championship game of the C-USA women's tournament where they lost to Middle Tennessee.

Roster

Rankings

Schedule

|-
!colspan=12 style=| Exhibition

|-
!colspan=12 style=| Non-conference regular season

|-
!colspan=12 style=|C-USA regular season

|-
!colspan=12 style=| C-USA Tournament

See also
2015–16 Old Dominion Monarchs men's basketball team

References

Old Dominion Monarchs women's basketball seasons
Old Dominion